ROSA Linux is a Linux operating system distribution, developed by the Russian company 'LLC NTC IT ROSA'. It is available in three different editions: ROSA Desktop Fresh, ROSA Enterprise Desktop, and ROSA Enterprise Linux Server, with the latter two aiming at commercial users. Its desktop computer editions come bundled with closed-source software such as Adobe Flash Player, multimedia codecs, and Steam.

ROSA Desktop Fresh R11.1, the latest desktop release as of 23 April 2020, is available with four different desktop environments: KDE Plasma 4, KDE Plasma 5, Xfce, and LXQt. It also contains open source software developed in-house by ROSA, such as ROSA Image Writer or ROSA Media Player. ROSA Linux has been certified by the Ministry of Defence of Russia.

ROSA originated as a fork of now defunct French distribution Mandriva Linux and has since then been developed independently. The ROSA company was founded in early 2010 and released the first version of its operating system in December 2010. It initially targeted enterprise users only, but in late 2012, ROSA started its end-user oriented distribution, Desktop Fresh. Before its bankruptcy, Mandriva developed its last releases jointly with ROSA. Mandriva 2011 was also based on ROSA. Also MagOS Linux, is based on ROSA.

Although its main popularity is in the Russian language market, ROSA Desktop also received favorable reviews by several non-Russian online publications. German technology website Golem.de praised ROSA for its stability and hardware support, while LinuxInsider.com called ROSA "a real Powerhouse".

Version history

Reception 
LinuxBSDos.com reviewed ROSA Desktop Fresh R2 with GNOME. He wrote:

LinuxBSDos.com also reviewed same version with KDE, and have the review about earlier version — Fresh and Marathon 2012.

In October 2012, Dedoimedo wrote review about ROSA Marathon 2012:

Dedoimedo also wrote review about ROSA Desktop Fresh R7.

Jesse Smith reviewed ROSA Desktop Fresh 2012 R1 for DistroWatch Weekly:

Smith also reviewed Fresh R9 version.

References

External links
 
 ROSA Linux Wiki
 ROSA Linux Bugzilla
 ROSA Linux Forum 
 ROSA Linux in DistroWatch
 ROSA Linux in the OpenSourceFeed Gallery

Computer-related introductions in 2010
KDE
Mandriva Linux
RPM-based Linux distributions
x86-64 Linux distributions
Linux distributions
Russian-language Linux distributions